Jorunna tomentosa is a species of sea slug, a dorid nudibranch, a shell-less marine gastropod mollusc in the family Discodorididae.

Distribution
This species occurs in European waters from Norway to Portugal and in the Mediterranean Sea. It has also been reported from South Africa and Tristan da Cunha.

Biology
Jorunna tomentosa feeds on the sponges Haliclona cinerea and Haliclona oculata.

References

 Hayward, P.J.; Ryland, J.S. (Ed.) (1990). The marine fauna of the British Isles and North-West Europe: 1. Introduction and protozoans to arthropods. Clarendon Press: Oxford, UK. . 627 pp. 
  Dayrat B. 2010. A monographic revision of discodorid sea slugs (Gastropoda, Opisthobranchia, Nudibranchia, Doridina). Proceedings of the California Academy of Sciences, Series 4, vol. 61, suppl. I, 1-403, 382 figs.

External links 

 Jorunna tomentosa from Portugal
 

Discodorididae
Gastropods described in 1804
Taxa named by Georges Cuvier